Vampire Circus is a 1972 British horror film directed by Robert Young and starring Adrienne Corri, Thorley Walters and Anthony Higgins (billed as Anthony Corlan). It was written by Judson Kinberg, and produced by Wilbur Stark and Michael Carreras (who was uncredited) for Hammer Film Productions. The story concerns a travelling circus, the vampiric artists of which prey on the children of a 19th century Serbian village. It was filmed at Pinewood Studios.

Plot 
One evening near the small Serbian village of Stetl early in the 19th century, schoolmaster Albert Müller witnesses his wife Anna taking a little girl, Jenny Schilt, into the castle of Count Mitterhaus, a reclusive nobleman rumoured to be a vampire responsible for the disappearances of other children. The rumours prove true, as Anna, who has become Mitterhaus' willing acolyte and mistress, gives Jenny to him to be drained of her blood. Men from the village, directed by Müller and including Jenny's father Mr. Schilt and the Bürgermeister, invade the castle and attack the Count. After the vampire kills several of them, Müller succeeds in driving a wooden stake through his heart. With his dying breath, Mitterhaus curses the villagers, vowing that their children will die to give him back his life. The angry villagers force Anna to run a gauntlet, but when her husband intervenes, she runs back into the castle where the briefly revived Count tells her to find his cousin Emil at "the Circus of Night". After laying his body in the crypt, she escapes through a tunnel as the villagers blow up the castle with gunpowder and set fire to it.

Fifteen years later, Stetl is being ravaged by a plague and blockaded by the authorities of neighbouring towns, with men ready to shoot any villager who tries to leave. The citizens fear that the pestilence may be due to the Count's curse, though the new physician Dr. Kersh dismisses vampires as just a myth. A travelling circus, calling itself the Circus of Night, then arrives at the village, directed by a dwarf and an alluring gypsy woman who are equivocal about how they got past the blockade; the villagers, appreciative of the distraction from their troubles, do not much question the matter. No-one in the village suspects that one of the circus artists, Emil, is Count Mitterhaus's cousin and a vampire, as are the twin acrobats Heinrich and Helga. Emil and the gypsy woman go to the ruins of the castle, where in the crypt they find the Count's staked body still preserved, and they restate his curse that all who killed him and all their children must die.

Whilst his son Anton distracts the armed men at the blockade, Dr. Kersh gets past them to appeal for help from the capital. At the Circus of Night, the villagers are amazed and delighted by the entertainment. Despite his wife's concerns over their wayward daughter, Rosa, and her attraction to the handsome Emil, the Bürgermeister takes her to the circus and, at the gypsy woman's invitation, visits its hall of mirrors where he sees, in one called "The Mirror of Life", a vision of a revived Count Mitterhaus, which causes him to collapse. Frightened by this event, Schilt tries to flee with his family from the blockaded village with the circus dwarf Michael as their guide, only to be abandoned by him in the forest and mauled to death by Emil, whose shapeshifting form is a black panther.

Müller's daughter Dora, whom he sent away earlier for her protection, has slipped past the blockade and is returning to the village to reunite with her father and her beloved Anton when she discovers the Schilts' dismembered bodies, arousing suspicions about the animals of the circus. That evening, Jon and Gustav Hauser, two village boys whose father helped instigate the killing of Mitterhaus, are invited by the gypsy woman to enter the hall of mirrors and are magically drawn by Heinrich and Helga to the Count's crypt, where they are killed and drained. After the boys' bodies are found near the castle, their grieving father and the sick Bürgermeister begin to shoot the circus animals. After an encounter with Emil the Bürgermeister dies of heart failure, and his daughter leaves with the vampire. The vampire then kills and drains her in the crypt.

Dora and Anton are lured by the twins into the hall of mirrors where they try to whisk Dora through the Mirror of Life, but the cross she is wearing saves her. Later, the vampires enter the school house where Dora and Anton have taken refuge. Emil, in panther form, kills the boarding students, diverting Anton, while the gypsy woman (revealed to be Anna Müller and the twins' mother) tears the cross from Dora's neck, enabling Heinrich and Helga to attack her. Dora, however, escapes into the school chapel, where the twins are overwhelmed by a giant crucifix which she topples on them, destroying them. Nevertheless, with the help of the circus strongman, Emil and Anna succeed in having Dora and her guardian, Hauser's wife Gerta, kidnapped and taken to the crypt at Castle Mitterhaus, where they intend to use their blood - just like the blood from their previous child victims - as part of a ritual to restore the Count back to life.

Meanwhile, Dr. Kersch returns from the capital with an imperial escort and medicines for the plague. He also brings news of vampire killings in other villages, all of them visited by the Circus of Night. The men attack the circus and set fire to it, killing the strongman when he tries to stop them. As Hauser starts to burn down the hall of mirrors, he sees in the Mirror of Life a vision of Emil and Anna bleeding Gerta over the Count's body. This horrifying sight distracts him long enough to be burned fatally by the fire, but he lives long enough to alert Anton and the other men to Dora's plight.

Back in the castle crypt, the suddenly remorseful Anna is killed when she attempts to save Dora from Emil. Anton, finding his way through the tunnel into the crypt despite a deadly ambush by Michael the dwarf, attempts to rescue Dora but is halted by Emil. Just then Müller, Dr. Kersh, and a soldier break into the crypt and battle Emil who kills or disables all his attackers, but Müller pierces him with the stake from the Count's chest just as he is dying from Emil's bite. Revived by the stake's removal, the Count rises from his sarcophagus and advances on Dora and Anton. Anton uses Müller's crossbow as a makeshift cross, repelling the Count long enough for him to jam the vampire's neck between the weapon's bow and stock and then pulling the trigger, decapitating him. As Dr. Kersh leads Dora and Anton from the tomb, he and the villagers set the ruins afire with torches, ending the curse, but Dora and Anton see a bat fly out of the tomb into the night and are left uncertain.

Cast 

 Adrienne Corri as Gypsy Woman
 Laurence Payne as Professor Albert Müller
 Thorley Walters as Peter, the Mayor of Stitl
 Lynne Frederick as Dora Müller
 John Moulder-Brown as Anton Kersh
 Elizabeth Seal as Gerta Hauser
 Anthony Higgins (billed as Anthony Corlan) as Emil
 Richard Owens as Dr. Kersh
 Domini Blythe as Anna Müller
 Robin Hunter as Mr Hauser
 Robert Tayman as Count Mitterhaus
 Robin Sachs as Heinrich (twin brother of Helga)
 Lalla Ward as Helga (twin sister of Heinrich)
 Skip Martin as Michael the dwarf
 David Prowse as the Strongman
 Mary Wimbush as Elvira
 Christina Paul as Rosa
 Roderick Shaw as Jon Hauser
 Barnaby Shaw as Gustav Hauser
 John Bown as Mr Schilt
 Sibylla Kay as Mrs. Schilt
 Jane Darby as Jenny Schilt
 Dorothy Frere as Granma Schilt
 Milovan Vesnitch as the erotic male dancer
 Serena as the erotic tiger-woman dancer
 Sean Hewitt as First Soldier
 David de Keyser as the voice of Mitterhaus's curse (uncredited)
Three of the cast - Laurence Payne, Adrienne Corri and Lalla Ward - would be reunited in the 1980 season of the British sci-fi/fantasy series Doctor Who in the serial The Leisure Hive. David Prowse, who later played Darth Vader in the first Star Wars trilogy, appears in a silent role as the circus strongman. Robin Sachs played the part of Ethan Rayne in Buffy the Vampire Slayer and as the space conqueror Sarris in the science-fiction comedy Galaxy Quest. Robin Sachs and Lynne Frederick also featured, as lovers Thomas Culpeper and Katherine Howard, in Henry VIII and his Six Wives (1973). In Stanley Kubrick's 1971 film of A Clockwork Orange, Corri had played the wife of writer F. Alexander, being ravaged by Alex and his droogs who left her husband crippled, to be shown later relying on the care of bodybuilder "Julius", portrayed by Prowse.

Production
George Baxt says Hammer paid him £1,000 just for the title and that was his only contribution.

Filming
Production began on 9 August 1971. First-time director Robert Young was unfamiliar with Hammer's tight production schedules, and at one point used up some 500 feet of film stock while trying to get a tiger to sink its teeth into a fake human arm stuffed with pork (it finally bit after beef was substituted). When filming stretched from the scheduled six weeks into seven, the production was shut down and the footage given to editor Peter Musgrave with instructions to make a finished film out of what he had.

Critical reception 
On Rotten Tomatoes the film holds an 80% approval rating based on reviews from 5 critics.

AllMovie called the film "one of the studio's more stylish and intelligent projects". PopMatters also called it "one of the company's last great classics", writing, "erotic, grotesque, chilling, bloody, suspenseful and loaded with doom and gloom atmosphere, this is the kind of experiment in terror that reinvigorates your love of the scary movie artform".

Critics at the time of its original release weren't quite as impressed. New York Times film reviewer Howard Thompson dismissed it outright without even the courtesy of a proper review, in favour of its Hammer stablemate Countess Dracula with which it shared a double bill. His curt review measured two sentences: "Wise horror fans will skip 'Vampire Circus' and settle for 'Countess Dracula' on the new double bill at the Forum. Both are Hammer Productions, England's scream factory, but the first was dealt a quick, careless anvil." before continuing with semi-praise for Countess Dracula. David Pirie in The Monthly Film Bulletin praised the "delicate fairy tale atmosphere" established in the early going but lamented that it was "only fleetingly sustained" as "the plot finally succumbs to formula." The Los Angeles Times was fairly positive, calling the film "a true chiller" with "lots of real-looking teeth, believable gore, and - save for a very lurid ending (not for the kiddies) - a lot of pace, a certain sense of subtlety and a definite, consistent style."

Novelisation 
An 'updated' novelisation by Mark Morris was published in 2012.

In other media 
The film was adapted into a 15-page comic strip for The House of Hammer (vol. 2) #17 (Feb. 1978). It was drawn by Brian Bolland from a script by Steve Parkhouse.

See also
 Vampire film

References

External links 
 
 

1972 films
1972 horror films
1970s historical horror films
British historical horror films
Films directed by Robert Young
Hammer Film Productions horror films
Films shot at Pinewood Studios
Circus films
Films set in Austria
Films set in castles
Films set in the 19th century
British vampire films
Films set in Serbia
1970s English-language films
1970s British films